This article details the Widnes Vikings rugby league football club's 2015 season. This was the Vikings' 4th consecutive season back in the Super League.

Pre season friendlies

Widnes score is first.

Table

Super League Table

Super 8 Qualifier's Table

2015 fixtures and results

2015 Super League Fixtures

2015 Super 8 Qualifiers

Player appearances
Super League Only

 = Injured

 = Suspended

Challenge Cup

Player appearances
Challenge Cup Games only

2015 squad statistics

 Appearances and points include (Super League, Challenge Cup and Play-offs) as of 27 September 2015.

 = Injured
 = Suspended

2015 transfers in/out

In

Out

References

External links
Widnes Vikings Website
Widnes Vikings - SL Website

Widnes Vikings seasons
Widnes Vikings season